Richard Alan Sisler (November 2, 1920 – November 20, 1998) was an American player, coach, and manager in Major League Baseball. The son of Hall of Fame first baseman and two-time .400 hitter George Sisler, Dick Sisler's younger brother Dave was a relief pitcher in the 1950s and 1960s with four MLB teams, and his older brother George Jr. was a longtime executive in Minor League Baseball (MiLB).

Early life
Sisler was born in St. Louis, Missouri. At John Burroughs School, a progressive private school his father helped found in 1923, he excelled in football, basketball, track, and baseball. Sisler enrolled at Colgate University, where he played baseball for one year before dropping out to sign a minor-league contract with the St. Louis Cardinals. He spent four years in the minor leagues, then, in 1943, enlisted in the United States Navy to help fight World War II. He rose to chief petty officer and served as a physical instructor at the Bainbridge Naval Training Center in Maryland. 

Upon his discharge in 1945, the Cardinals sent him to Cuba to learn how to play first base. After a couple of weeks, the Cubans were proclaiming Sisler as their Babe Ruth. In his first game, Sisler recorded two home runs and in another game hit three more. He then made his MLB debut with the Redbirds in April 1946, spending a full season for the eventual National League and World Series champions.

Playing career

Sisler was a journeyman left fielder and first baseman for the Cardinals (1946–47; 1952–53), Philadelphia Phillies (1948–51) and Cincinnati Reds (1952). He was traded along with Virgil Stallcup from the Reds to the Cardinals for Wally Westlake and Eddie Kazak on May 13, 1952. In an eight-season major-league career, he hit  .276 with 720 hits, 55 home runs and 360 RBI in 799 games. Defensively, he recorded an overall .984 fielding percentage playing primarily at first base and left field.

Only with the Phillies did Sisler play on a consistent basis; he was Philadelphia's most-used first baseman in 1948 and 1949, and regular left fielder in 1950 and 1951. He made the National League All-Star team in 1950, a season during which Sisler reached personal bests in games played (141), games started (136, all in left field), at bats (523), runs scored (79), hits (155), doubles (29), homers (13), runs batted in (83), on-base percentage (.373), slugging percentage (.442) and batting average (.296). The season also gave Sisler lasting fame.

Pennant-winning home run
On the 1950 season's closing day, at Ebbets Field, with the game tied at one, Sisler hit a tenth-inning, opposite-field three-run home run against the Brooklyn Dodgers that led to the "Whiz Kids" Phillies winning the club's first National League pennant in 35 years. Had Philadelphia lost, the Phillies and Dodgers would have finished in a flatfooted tie for the NL championship and played a best-of-three playoff. 

The home run (coupled with his slugging five years earlier in the Cuban winter league) made Sisler world-famous in baseball and literary circles when Ernest Hemingway immortalized him in his novel The Old Man and the Sea.  In a conversation between an aging Cuban fisherman and his young apprentice discussing the unfolding 1950 big-league season, the older man says:
"In the other league, between Brooklyn and Philadelphia, I must take Brooklyn. But then I think of Dick Sisler and those great drives in the old park. There was nothing ever like them. He hits the longest ball I have ever seen."

His father, George Sr., was a scout for Brooklyn in 1950. When asked after the pennant-winning game how he felt when his son beat his current team, the Dodgers, George replied, "I felt awful and terrific at the same time."

In the 1950 World Series that followed, however, Sisler would collect only one single in 17 at bats (.059), as the Phillies were swept by the New York Yankees in four games. Earlier, in 1946, he had gone hitless in two at bats as a pinch hitter for the Cardinals in that season's Fall Classic, but picked up a World Series ring when the Redbirds defeated the Boston Red Sox in seven games.

Coaching and managerial career

In August , he was promoted to acting manager when Hutchinson, suffering from terminal cancer, was forced to give up the reins. He led the Reds to a 32–21 record, and the team finished in a second-place tie (with the Phillies), one game behind the Cardinals. He then returned to the major league coaching ranks with the Cardinals (1966–70), San Diego Padres (1975–76) and New York Mets (1979–80). In , while serving as the Cardinals' first base coach, Sisler earned his second World Series ring when St. Louis again defeated the Red Sox in seven games. In his late sixties, he was still working with young players as a roving hitting instructor in the Cardinal farm system.

He died November 20, 1998, at the age of 78 in Nashville, Tennessee.

See also
 List of second-generation Major League Baseball players
 List of St. Louis Cardinals coaches

References

Further reading

External links

Dick Sisler st SABR (Baseball BioProject)
Dick Sisler at The Deadball Era

1920 births
1998 deaths
Asheville Tourists players
Baseball players from St. Louis
Cincinnati Reds coaches
Cincinnati Reds managers
Cincinnati Reds players
Colgate University alumni
Columbus Red Birds players
Decatur Commodores players
Major League Baseball first basemen
Major League Baseball first base coaches
Major League Baseball hitting coaches
Major League Baseball left fielders
Nashville Vols managers
Nashville Vols players
New Orleans Pelicans (baseball) players
New York Mets coaches
Philadelphia Phillies players
St. Louis Cardinals coaches
St. Louis Cardinals players
San Diego Padres coaches
San Diego Padres (minor league) players
United States Navy personnel of World War II
Washington Red Birds players